Vemuri Radhakrishna , hailing from Ethonda village, Kotagiri, nizamabad district is the managing director of ABN Andhra Jyothi. Radhakrishna did take over Andhra Jyoti from prior owner K.L.N. Prasad, and launched it on 15 October 2002. He is known for his famous show, Open Heart with RK (OHRK) in ABN New Channel.

References

Living people
Telugu people
Businesspeople from Andhra Pradesh
Indian mass media owners
Indian publishers (people)
Year of birth missing (living people)